Daily Chronicle may refer to:
 Daily Chronicle (United Kingdom), a British newspaper which merged into the News Chronicle
 Daily Chronicle (Illinois), a newspaper in DeKalb County, Illinois
 Daily Chronicle (New Zealand), a newspaper in New Zealand
 Spokane Daily Chronicle, a newspaper in Spokane, Washington published from 1881 until 1992
 The Chronicle (Centralia, Washington), a newspaper in Centralia, Washington